Racinaea venusta is a species of flowering plant in the genus Racinaea. This species is native from Costa Rica to Ecuador.

References

venusta
Flora of Costa Rica
Flora of Ecuador